Dugan Branch is a stream in Crawford County in the U.S. state of Missouri. It is a tributary of Shoal Creek.

Dugan Branch has the name of J. M. "Dugan" Gillam, the original owner of the site.

See also
List of rivers of Missouri

References

Rivers of Crawford County, Missouri
Rivers of Missouri